New Boston is an unincorporated community in Harrison County, Indiana, in the United States.

The community was likely named after Boston, Lincolnshire or Boston, Massachusetts.

References

Unincorporated communities in Harrison County, Indiana
Unincorporated communities in Indiana